Samuel Palmer (1805–1881) was an English painter.

Samuel Palmer may also refer to:

Samuel Palmer (biographer) (1741–1813), English minister
Samuel Palmer (printer) (??–1732), English printer
Samuel Palmer (surgeon) (1670–1738), English surgeon

See also
Samuel Palmer Brooks (1863–1931), American academic administrator